"Right Between the Eyes" is a song by English duo Wax. It appears on the album Magnetic Heaven, and was released as the duo's third single from the album.

Reception
The song became a No. 1 hit in Spain and a moderate hit in Ireland, Belgium and the Netherlands. In the U.S. it reached No. 43 while in the UK, the song managed a peak charting of No. 60, and remained on the chart for 5 weeks.

Track listing
7"/12" single
A. "Right Between the Eyes" - 4:05/6:57
B. "Only a Visitor" - 4:57

Charts

References

1986 songs
1986 singles
Wax (British band) songs
RCA Records singles
Number-one singles in Spain
Songs written by Andrew Gold
Songs written by Graham Gouldman
Song recordings produced by Phil Thornalley